Walnut Grove is an unincorporated community in Putnam County, Illinois, United States, located on the western shore of Senachwine Lake.

References

Unincorporated communities in Putnam County, Illinois
Unincorporated communities in Illinois